Nikoloz Rachveli (born 15 May 1979) is a Georgian conductor, composer and cultural manager. He composes and arranges for theatre and film, using themes from Georgian and non-Georgian composers. Memanishvili is the Principal Conductor of the Georgia National Symphony Orchestra, and Head of the Georgia National Music Center. He has been leading the Mikeladze Symphony Orchestra since 2007.

Childhood and education
Nikoloz (Nika) Rachveli was born to Georgian parents in Tbilisi. His family originated from the Racha region in Western Georgia, hence the artist's name Rachveli, which literally means "from Racha". It was in Racha where the composer was first exposed to Georgian chants and polyphonic folk songs. 

He began music studies at Tbilisi Mikeladze Music School and at the age of nine wrote a children’s opera, staged by musician and director Maka Aroshidze. While at the school he formed a jazz band in which he played piano. He was encouraged to perform publicly by musicologist Evgeny Machavariani, artistic director of the Georgian State Philharmonic.

Memanishvili attended the Evgeni Mikeladze Art College, graduating in 1996. Further study was at the University of Music and Performing Arts, Vienna, from 1999 to 2003, and the Tbilisi State Conservatoire department of composition, from where he graduated in 2005.

Career
When 10 years old Memanishvili was invited to conduct the State Symphonic Orchestra of Georgia by its Artistic Director Jansugh Kakhidze. Later, in 2005, Memanishvili became the principal conductor for the same orchestra. As an 11-year-old he conducted Beethoven’s Fifth Symphony for the Georgian State Symphony Orchestra. He performed his first piano and organ pieces at age 13 on a tour of German cities, through the invitation of artistic director Hermann Wedekind.

In 1995 Memanishvili was listed in the book of UNESCO "New faces of the planet" awards, and, in 2001, was granted a State Premium by Georgian Ministry of Culture for his original music for the theatre performance of Late Requiem. In 2003 he conducted the premiere of Giya Kancheli's vocal-instrumental work Little Imber in the UK, which was recorded and released by ECM Records.

In 2004 he was appointed Artistic Director of the Tbilisi Music and Drama State Theatre, and in 2005 became Head of the Georgia National Music Center, which houses the National Symphony and Chamber Orchestras, and National Choir and String Quartet. While at the Center he founded the contemporary music festival 'Kontrapunkt' and the string quartet festival 'String Quartet Welcomes'. Memanishvili became the Principal Conductor and General Director of National Symphony Orchestra in 2007. His repertoire included pieces from Georgian composers and wider-world symphony and opera works.

In 2010 he was awarded a best theatre music prize for the David Doiashvili production of Macbeth in the Croatian International Theatre Festival.

Memanishvili is an author of original orchestral works, and a conductor of Tbilisi Music and Drama Theatre's performances of well-known compositions. His musical Keto and Kote, staged in Tbilisi and Batumi in 2010, was a combination of Victor Dolidze’s opera and A. Kereselidze’s cinema version of the piece. After Keto and Kote he orchestrated Vera District Melodies – original music by G. Tsabadze which was used in the film under the same name in 2012 – which was staged in Tbilisi and Batumi by producer and choreographer Redha Benteifour.

References

1979 births
Living people
20th-century composers
21st-century composers
Composers from Georgia (country)
Musicians from Tbilisi
Conductors (music) from Georgia (country)
20th-century conductors (music)
21st-century conductors (music)